Halabor is a village in Zakarpattia Oblast (province) in western Ukraine.

Geography
The village is administered as part of the Berehove Raion, Zakarpattia Oblast.

History
The name originates from the word Hrábr. It was first mentioned as Harabur in 1300.

Population
In 1910, it had a population of 508, mostly Hungarians. Now the population is 640 inhabitants, of which 630 (98 per cent) are Hungarians.

Villages in Berehove Raion